Cedar Cove is an American drama television series on the Hallmark Channel that began on July 20, 2013. Based on author Debbie Macomber's book series of the same name, Cedar Cove focuses on Municipal Court Judge Olivia Lockhart's professional and personal life. It is the network's first-ever original, scripted series. During the course of its run, it aired 36 episodes.

Series overview

Episodes

Season 1 (2013)

Season 2 (2014)

Season 3 (2015)

References

External links
 Episode Guide on the official Hallmark website
 

Lists of American drama television series episodes